Tatwine ( – 30 July 734) was the tenth Archbishop of Canterbury from 731 to 734. Prior to becoming archbishop, he was a monk and abbot of a Benedictine monastery. Besides his ecclesiastical career, Tatwine was a writer, and riddles he composed survive. Another work he composed was on the grammar of the Latin language, which was aimed at advanced students of that language.  He was subsequently considered a saint.

Biography
Tatwine was a Mercian by birth. His epigraph at Canterbury stated that when he died he was in old age, so perhaps he was born around 670. He became a monk at the monastery at Breedon-on-the-Hill in the present-day County of Leicestershire, and then abbot of that house. Through the influence of King Æthelbald he was appointed as Archbishop of Canterbury in 731 and was consecrated on 10 June 731. He was one of a number of Mercians who were appointed to Canterbury during the 730s and 740s. Apart from his consecration of the Bishops of Lindsey and Selsey in 733, Tatwine's period as archbishop appears to have been uneventful. He died in office on 30 July 734. Later considered a saint, his feast day is 30 July.

Writings
Bede's commentary on Tatwine calls him a "" (a man notable for his prudence, devotion and learning). These qualities were displayed in the two surviving manuscripts of his riddles and four of his .

Ars Gramattica Tatuini
The  is one of only two surviving eighth-century Latin grammars from England. The grammar is a reworking of Donatus's  with the addition of information drawn from other grammarians, such as Priscian and Consentius. It was not designed for a newcomer to the Latin language, but rather for more advanced students. It covers the eight parts of speech through illustrations drawn from classical scholars, although not directly but through other grammatical works. There are also some examples drawn from the Psalms. The work was completed before Tatwine became archbishop, and was used not only in England but also on the Continent.

Riddles
Frederick Tupper believed that Aldhelm's influence was minimal, but subsequent scholars have argued that Tatwine's riddles owed a substantial debt to those of Aldhelm.

Tatwine's riddles deal with such diverse topics as philosophy and charity, the five senses and the alphabet, and a book, and a pen, yet, according to Mercedes Salvador-Bello, these riddles are placed in a carefully structured sequence: 1–3 and 21–26 on theology (e.g. 2, faith, hope, and charity), 4–14 on objects associated with ecclesiastical life (e.g. 7, a bell), 15–20 on wonders and monsters (e.g. 16, prepositions with two cases), 27–39 on tools and related natural phenomena (e.g. 28, an anvil, and 33, fire), with a final piece on the sun's rays.

Tatwine's riddles survive in two manuscripts: the early 11th-century London, British Library, Royal 12.Cxxiii (fols. 121v–7r) and the mid-11th-century Cambridge, University Library, Gg.5.35 (fols. 374v–77v). In both manuscripts, they are written alongside the riddles of Eusebius: it seems clear that Eusebius (whose identity is uncertain) added sixty riddles to Tatwine's forty to take the collection up to one hundred.

Tatwine gives a sign in one of the riddles of the growing acceptance among scholars in the Christian west of the legitimacy of philosophy: "" (Of Philosophy: happy is he who can know my laws). The riddles are formed in acrostics.

Example
An example of Tatwine's work is enigma 11, on the needle:

List
Tatwine's riddles are on the following topics.

Editions and translations
 'Aenigmata Tatvini', ed. by Fr. Glorie, trans. by Erika von Erhardt-Seebold, in Tatuini omnia opera, Variae collectiones aenigmatum merovingicae aetatis, Anonymus de dubiis nominibus, Corpus christianorum: series latina, 133-133a, 2 vols (Turnholt: Brepols, 1968), I 165–208.

Notes

Citations

References

Further reading

External links
 

670s births
734 deaths
8th-century archbishops
8th-century English writers
8th-century Latin writers
Archbishops of Canterbury
Grammarians of Latin
Linguists from England
Medieval linguists
Year of birth uncertain
Riddles
Latin poetry